Pyrostria socotrana is a species of flowering plant in the family Rubiaceae. It is endemic to the Socotra archipelago, which is part of Yemen.  Its natural habitat is subtropical or tropical dry forests.

External links 
 World Checklist of Rubiaceae

Sources 

Vanguerieae
Endemic flora of Socotra
Vulnerable plants
Taxonomy articles created by Polbot
Taxa named by Diane Mary Bridson